Jacinta Renee Hoyt (born April 2, 1987) is the head women’s college basketball coach for the Oklahoma State Cowgirls.

Playing career
Hoyt attended Hoxie High School in Kansas and played for her mother, Shelly. Jacie was a three-time all-state selection in volleyball and basketball. She scored more than 2,000 points in her high school career and averaged more than 26 points per game. In her senior season she averaged 28 points, 7 assists, 6 rebounds, and 6 steals a game.

Hoyt then attended Colby Community College during her freshman season, playing seven games before breaking her ankle and ending her season. She then transferred to Wichita State, where she played the final three years of her career, starting every game of her junior and senior seasons. In her senior season, 2008–09, she led the Shockers with 71 assists, which ranked fourth in the Missouri Valley Conference.

She graduated magna cum laude from Wichita State.

Wichita State statistics

Source

Coaching career
Hoyt started her coaching career at Fort Hays State before being reunited with her college coach, Jane Albright at Nevada. After three years with Nevada, she would join Kansas State and would help the team get to the WNIT and reach the NCAA tournament twice.

UMKC/Kansas City
Hoyt was named head coach of the UMKC Roos on May 11, 2017. In the 2019–20 season, the Roos won the WAC regular season and the first game of the 2020 WAC tournament before the rest of the tournament and possibly postseason tournaments were cancelled.

Oklahoma State
Hoyt was named the head coach of the Oklahoma State Cowgirls on March 20, 2022.

Head coaching record

References 

1987 births
Living people
People from Ogallala, Nebraska
People from Hoxie, Kansas
Basketball players from Nebraska
Basketball players from Kansas
Basketball coaches from Nebraska
Basketball coaches from Kansas
Colby Trojans women's basketball players
Wichita State Shockers women's basketball players
Fort Hays State Tigers women's basketball coaches
Nevada Wolf Pack women's basketball coaches
Kansas State Wildcats women's basketball coaches
Kansas City Roos women's basketball coaches
Oklahoma State Cowgirls basketball coaches